From 1993 to 2005, the Marlins Television Network aired games to homes not only in South Florida but to other parts of Florida. The network was produced by the same crew that telecast Marlins games on cable television. When Fox Sports Florida signed an exclusive long-term deal for Marlins baseball starting in the 2006 season, that signaled the end of the Marlins Television Network as a majority of those telecasts would air on Sun Sports.

Affiliates by market

Miami (Flagship)
WBFS-TV (1993–1998)
WAMI-TV (1999–2001)
WPXM-TV (2002–2005)

Palm Beach/Treasure Coast
WPTV (1993, split schedule with WAQ)
W19AQ (1993–1995)
WTVX-TV (1996–1998)
WHDT (1999–2000, Palm Beach only)
WWCI-CA (1999–2000, Treasure Coast only)
WTCN-CA (2000–2002)
WPXP (2003–2005)

Pensacola
WJTC-TV (1993)

Fort Myers/Naples
WTVK-TV (1993–1998)
WEVU (2004)

Orlando/Melbourne/Daytona Beach
WIRB-TV (1993–1994)
WRBW-TV (1995–1997)

Tampa Bay
WTMV-TV (1993–1997; Tampa Bay market removed from Marlins' territory in 1998 with launch of Tampa Bay Rays franchise)

Jacksonville
Continental Cablevision (1993–1998, Cable system carried games; became MediaOne in 1997)

Gainesville/Ocala
Cox Sports Television (2004–2005, Cable system carried games)

See also
Major League Baseball on regional sports networks
List of Florida Marlins broadcasters

Television Network
Major League Baseball on television
Television channels and stations established in 1993
Television channels and stations disestablished in 2005
Defunct television networks in the United States